Johnny Sands (born Elbert Harp Jr., April 29, 1928 – December 30, 2003) was an American film and television actor. He worked in over a dozen films, and on television, before he retired from show business in 1971. He then worked as a real estate agent in Hawaii, until retiring in 1991.

Early years
Sands was born in Lorenzo, Texas. When he was 13, he went to Hollywood to work as an usher in a theater.

Career
Discovered by a talent scout on his way to the beach, he chose his professional name for his love of sand and surf.

Sands' screen debut was in Affairs of Geraldine (1946). He is perhaps best remembered for his role in The Bachelor and the Bobby-Soxer (1947), with Shirley Temple, Cary Grant and Myrna Loy, as Shirley Temple's boyfriend, Jerry White; as well as the title character in Aladdin and His Lamp (1952).

He also appeared in The Stranger (1946), with Orson Welles, Loretta Young, and Edward G. Robinson; and, Till the End of Time (1946), with Guy Madison, Robert Mitchum and Dorothy McGuire.

A popular actor who worked in over a dozen films, as well as television shows such as Perry Mason, with Raymond Burr, he continued to receive fan mail for the rest of his life. 

Sands eventually left acting and moved to Hawaii, launching a career in real estate.

Personal life
Sands was married twice, first to Sue Allen in 1947, but it lasted only six months.

Death
Sands died on December 30, 2003, at his home in Ainaloa, Hawaii.

Filmography

References

External links

Johnny Sands, Filmography, at TCM
Johnny Sands; Began Career as Usher, Obituaries, January 14, 2004, at Los Angeles Times

1928 births
2003 deaths
American male film actors
American male television actors
People from Crosby County, Texas
Male actors from Texas
21st-century American male actors
20th-century American male actors